"I Can Be" is a song by British singer-songwriter Taio Cruz, released as the fourth single from his debut album Departure, released in May 2008. The song peaked at number 18 on the UK Singles Chart. The single's B-side, "Disco Fever", was written and recorded exclusively for the release, and featured in the television adverts for Britannia High, an ITV1 musical series broadcast in July 2008.

Reception
Digital Spy gave the song three out of five stars, claiming the song's "electro beats and string samples are subtler and more graceful than Timbaland's chunky wallops" and "the ultra-confident and cliché-packed lyrics, though not to everyone's tastes, are refreshingly unpretentious."

Track listing
 CD single
 "I Can Be" (Radio Edit) - 2:52
 "Disco Fever" - 3:22
 "I Can Be" (Digital Dog Club Mix) - 6:18
 "Moving On" (Rokstarr Remix) - 4:15

 Digital download
 "I Can Be" (Radio Edit) - 2:52
 "I Can Be" (Edit) (featuring Estelle) - 3:28

 Digital download - EP
 "I Can Be" (Digital Dog Club Radio Edit) - 3:04
 "I Can Be" (Digital Dog Urban Remix) - 3:37
 "I Can Be" (Delinquent Remix) - 5:44

Charts

Weekly charts

Year-end charts

References

2007 songs
2008 singles
Taio Cruz songs
Songs written by Taio Cruz
Island Records singles